Sascha Stulz (born 3 June 1988) is a Swiss former professional footballer who played as a goalkeeper.

Notes

1988 births
People from Interlaken
Living people
Swiss men's footballers
Association football goalkeepers
FC Thun players
FC Schaffhausen players
Swiss Super League players
Swiss Challenge League players
Swiss 1. Liga (football) players
2. Liga Interregional players
Sportspeople from the canton of Bern